Congregation Beth Israel is a Reform synagogue located at 9001 Towne Centre Drive in San Diego, California. Formally incorporated in 1887, Beth Israel traces its roots back to 1861. It is San Diego's largest and oldest Jewish congregation.

History
Jews first came to San Diego in 1850, and organized High Holiday services each year. In 1861, led by Marcus Schiller, they organized a congregation called "Adath Yeshurun". In early 1887 they formally incorporated under the name "Beth Israel".

Beth Israel's first building still stands in Heritage Park, which is adjacent to Old Town San Diego State Historic Park.  The wooden building was erected in 1889 at Second Avenue and Beech Street, in the wake of a boom in economic activity and population that resulted from the November 1885 completion of the California Southern Railroad connecting San Diego to the Atlantic and Pacific Railroad in Barstow, California. Services were first held there on September 25, 1889. One of the oldest synagogue buildings in the American West, it was used by the Congregation until 1926, when the Congregation moved to its second, larger building at Third and Laurel. At the time the congregation numbered around 60 families.

The Third and Laurel site occupied a full city block, and included a number of structures. In addition to the synagogue building, there was an adjacent social hall, a school building, and a number of small apartments. When the congregation moved in early 2001, it retained the school and social hall.

Beth Israel purchased a  lot in University City in 1993. Construction on new facilities there began in January 2000 and were dedicated in October 2001.

Jonathan Stein, who was Senior Rabbi at the synagogue, became Senior Rabbi at Temple Shaaray Tefila on New York City's Upper East Side.

Current status
Beth Israel has over 2,000 members and nearly 1,100 households, making it San Diego's largest and oldest Jewish congregation. The clergy includes Senior Rabbi Jason Nevarez, Rabbi/Cantor Arlene Bernstein, and Associate Rabbi Jeremy Gimbel. In June 2019, Senior Rabbi Michael Berk became Beth Israel's Rabbi Emeritus.

Notes

External links

 Official web-site for Heritage Park, which includes a photo and information for Temple Beth Israel (1889)

Jews and Judaism in San Diego
Reform synagogues in California
Religious organizations established in 1887
Synagogues preserved as museums
Religious buildings and structures in San Diego
Landmarks in San Diego
1887 establishments in California
Synagogues completed in 1889
Synagogues completed in 1926
Synagogues completed in 2001